Marek is the West Slavic (Czech, Polish and Slovak) masculine equivalent of Marcus, Marc or Mark. The name may refer to:

 Marek (given name)
 Marek (surname)
 Marek, the pseudonym of Bulgarian communist Stanke Dimitrov (1889–1944)
 The title character of Oberinspektor Marek, an Austrian television series

See also
 
 Marek's disease
 VC Marek Union-Ivkoni, Bulgarian professional men's volleyball team, based in Dupnitsa
 Marek i Wacek (meaning Marek and Wacek), a musical duo of Polish pianists Marek Tomaszewski and Wacław "Wacek" Kisielewski
 Marrick
 Merrick (disambiguation)
 Mereg, also spelled Merek, a village in Iran